The 2013 Mid-American Conference men's basketball tournament was the post-season basketball tournament for the Mid-American Conference (MAC) 2012–13 college basketball season. The 2013 tournament was held between March 11–16, 2013. Akron, as the winner of the tournament received the MAC's automatic bid into the 2013 NCAA tournament.

Format
The 2013 MAC tournament only had 11 teams due to Toledo being ineligible for post season play due to low APR Scores. First round games were held on campus sites at the higher seed on March 11. The remaining rounds were held at Quicken Loans Arena, between March 13–16. As with the 2012 tournament, the top two seeds (Akron and Ohio, respectively) received byes into the semifinals, with the three seed (Western Michigan) and four seed (Kent State) receiving a bye to the quarterfinals. No. 5 Ball State received a first round bye.

Tournament seeding

Schedule

Bracket

References

Mid-American Conference men's basketball tournament
Tournament
MAC men's basketball tournament
MAC men's basketball tournament
Basketball in Cleveland